Project I.G.I. (released in North America as Project I.G.I.: I'm Going In) is a tactical first-person shooter video game. It was developed by Innerloop Studios and released in December 2000 by Eidos Interactive. The game received mixed reviews due to shortcomings including a poorly programmed A.I., lack of a mid-game save option, and the lack of multiplayer features. However it was praised for its sound design and graphics, thanks in part to its use of a proprietary game engine that was previously used in Innerloop's Joint Strike Fighter.

It was followed up in 2003 by I.G.I.-2: Covert Strike.

A prequel titled I.G.I. Origins was announced by publisher Toadman Interactive in 2019 and is being developed by AntiMatter Games with a release date yet to be announced.

Plot
Protagonist David Jones and his analyst Anya learn that a Russian Arms dealer named Josef Priboi had been kidnapped by Russian Mafia and imprisoned in a Military Airbase. After rescue Josef admits that his uncle Jach is selling a nuclear warhead to someone. After capturing the uncle, Jach Priboi admits to selling it to a Russian leader named EKK. Jones gets orders to transport Jach to headquarters with a chopper .But the chopper gets shot down by Migs near the Russian Border . EKK captures Jach and orders Jones to be killed, but Jones escapes and crosses the border and is rescued by a chopper. He hijacks the train carrying Jach, but EKK derails the train. Jones and Jach escape by a chopper sent by Anya. Jones gets orders to retrieve the warhead and terminate EKK. But he discovers a broken warhead (used to make a nuclear bomb) and fails to kill EKK as she escapes. Then he infiltrates the nuclear base where EKK planted the bomb. Jones kills EKK ,and Anya defuses the bomb.

Reception

The game received "average" reviews according to the review aggregation website Metacritic. Samuel Bass of Next Generation said that the game "quickly transforms itself into a frustratingly mediocre experience".

It received a "Silver" sales award from the Entertainment and Leisure Software Publishers Association (ELSPA), indicating sales of at least 100,000 copies in the United Kingdom.

References

External links

2000 video games
Eidos Interactive games
First-person shooters
Spy video games
Tactical shooter video games
Video games developed in Norway
Video games set in Russia
Windows games
Windows-only games